Ceylon is an extinct town in Camden County, in the U.S. state of Georgia. The GNIS classifies it as a populated place.

History
A post office called Ceylon was established in 1905, and remained in operation until 1916. The community was named after Ceylon, a name applied to the South Asian island nation of Sri Lanka during British colonial rule.

References

Geography of Camden County, Georgia
Ghost towns in Georgia (U.S. state)